Siyətük (also, Seatuk) is a village and municipality in the Astara Rayon of Azerbaijan. It has a population of 982. The municipality consists of the villages of Siyətük, Vəznəş, and Sekəşam.

References 

Populated places in Astara District